Daniel Amigo (born September 13, 1995) is a Mexican-American-Argentine professional basketball player for Libertadores de Querétaro of the Liga Nacional de Baloncesto Profesional (LNBP). He played college basketball for the Denver Pioneers. He plays for the Mexico men's national basketball team.

High school career
Amigo attended Coronado High School. As a senior, he averaged 20 points and 10 rebounds per game. He committed to Denver.

College career
As a freshman at Denver, Amigo averaged 6.1 points and 1.5 rebounds per game. He averaged 2.1 points and 1.3 rebounds per game as a sophomore. Following the season, Rodney Billups was hired as head coach, and Amigo sharply increased his production during his junior season. He averaged 15.5 points and 7.1 rebounds per game as a junior, earning Second Team All-Summit League honors. As a senior, Amigo averaged 15.3 points and 6.6 rebounds per game, shooting 52 percent from the field. He was named to the Second Team All-Summit League.

Professional career
In June 2018, Amigo signed with Debreceni EAC of the NB I/A. On August 17, 2019, he signed with the Soles de Mexicali of the Liga Nacional de Baloncesto Profesional. In June 2020, Amigo signed with BC Pieno žvaigždės of the Lithuanian league. He averaged 10 points, 4.5 rebounds, and 1.3 assists per game. On July 6, 2021, Amigo returned to the Soles de Mexicali. He averaged 10.5 points, 4 rebounds and 1.8 assists per game. On November 29, Amigo signed with Polski Cukier Toruń of the Polish Basketball League.

National team career
Amigo has represented Mexico and Argentina in international competitions, as he has an Argentine father and Mexican mother. He participated in the 2017 FIBA AmeriCup for Argentina, at the request of Sergio Hernández. Amigo helped Mexico reach the semifinal round of the qualifying tournament for the 2020 Summer Olympics.

References

External links
Denver Pioneers bio

1995 births
Living people
American expatriate basketball people in Hungary
American expatriate basketball people in Lithuania
American expatriate basketball people in Mexico
American men's basketball players
Argentine men's basketball players
Basketball players from El Paso, Texas
Centers (basketball)
Denver Pioneers men's basketball players
Mexican men's basketball players
Soles de Mexicali players
Twarde Pierniki Toruń players